Filonov is a surname. Notable people with the surname include:

 Alexey Filonov (born 1961), Russian swimmer
 Oleh Filonov (born 2004), Ukrainian footballer
 Pavel Filonov (1883–1941), Russian avant-garde painter, art theorist, and poet

Russian-language surnames